Panathady is a village in Kasaragod district in the state of Kerala, India. Panathady Panchayat is in Vellarikundu taluk. It is 36 kilometers away from the nearest municipality, Kanhangad, and it is 8 kilometers away from the Kerala-Karnataka border, Panathur.

Politically, Panathady is included in the Kanhangad legislative assembly and Kasaragode Loksabha assembly.

Administration
This panchayath is administered as a part  of the newly formed Vellarikundu taluk. Panchayath is ruled by LDF local self government. Mrs. Prasanna Prasad is the current president of Panathady panchayath. The administrative office, ie: Panchayath Office is at Panathur. Village office also situated in Panathur.

Demographics
 India census, Panathady had a population of 22307 with 11200 males and 11107 females.

The most widely spoken language is Malayalam. The most common religions are Hinduism, Islam and Christianity. There are four tribal communities inhabiting this area: Mavilan, Malavettuva  Kudiya and Marati.

Economy
The economy is mostly agriculture based, with rubber, paddy, banana, coconut and the Areca nut being the most cultivated products.

Education
There is one higher secondary school, GHSS Balanthode. GHS Panathur and many primary schools are situated in the main Panathady village.
Apart from these two High Schools there are other three more government schools in panathady, They are Govt LP school Kallappalli, Govt LP school Peruthadi and Govt LP school Parakkadavu. St. Mary's English Medium School is the another main School in Panathady panchayath. Panathady have only one College, St. Marys Arts and Science college, Affiliated to Kannur University.

Geography
Geographically, it is a hilly region, and is part of the Western Ghats.

Transportation
Panathady located in kerala karanataka border. Nearest town is Sullia, Karnataka, which is 30 km from Panathadi. Kanhangad is the nearest town in kerala side and it is 36 km away from Panathady. People uses Private and KSRTC buses for transportation mainly. There is no Railway connectivity here. Proposed Kanhangad- Kanoyoor Railway line connect panathady. From Panathady Karantaka towns like sullia, Bhagamandala, Madikkeri, puttur etc. can be accessed easily. KSRTC and private buses connects these towns from Panathady. Famous tourism place Madikkeri/Coorg is 72 km away from Panathady. People who are traveling to Bangalore or Mysore pass through panathadi. For Local transportation People uses Jeep services and Auto Rikshas. Places like Ranipuram, Peruthadi, Parakkadavu, Kallappalli etc. are the places where there is no proper transportation medium is not available.

Climate
Panathady have mixed climate. Summer is Hot and During Rainy season and Winter time panathady get cooler climate.

Tourism
Ranipuram, the famous tourism place is in Panathady Panchayath/Village. It is famous for its Weather, beauty etc. In panathady you  an also see stunning local waterfalls, which are not commercialized yet. Water falls like jothlag water falls, are stunning and mind blowing. Balanthode Check dam is another attraction. Branch of Chandragiri River flow through here and the check dam is the best place for swimming.(Summer is the best time).

References

Panathur area